Marsdenia rostrata, the Milk Vine is a common climbing plant found in eastern, Australia. This member of the Dogbane family features white milky sap, when leaves are broken from the stem. It is found in a variety of habitats in relatively high rainfall areas, including rainforest and wet eucalyptus forest. Widespread in distribution in coastal regions, though it also appears inland in places such as the Liverpool Range. It may grow to ten metres tall, with a woody stem up to 4 cm wide. Leaves range from 4 to 13 cm long and 2 to 7 cm wide. The fruit is somewhat pear shaped, 5 cm by 2.5 cm.

The specific epithet rostrata is from ancient Greek, and it refers to the “beaked” head of the flower's stigma. In 1810, this species first appeared in scientific literature, in the Prodromus Florae Novae Hollandiae, authored by the prolific Scottish botanist, Robert Brown.

References

Marsdenia
Flora of New South Wales
Flora of Lord Howe Island
Flora of Victoria (Australia)
Flora of Queensland
Plants described in 1810